The albums discography of American country artist Bobby Bare contains 39 studio albums, 28 compilation albums, two box sets and one live album. Bare's first album was a compilation released in August 1963 on RCA Victor titled "Detroit City" and Other Hits by Bobby Bare. The disc was one of several to reach the top ten of the American Billboard Top Country Albums chart. It also reached number 119 on the Billboard 200 albums chart. It was followed by his debut studio LP in December 1963 by RCA Victor titled 500 Miles Away from Home. The disc reached similar chart positions on the Billboard country and 200 albums lists. Bare's follow-up LP's reached the country albums top ten in 1966: Talk Me Some Sense and The Streets of Baltimore. He also collaborated with Skeeter Davis during this time on the studio disc Tunes for Two (1965), which charted at number eight on the country albums list. In 1967, he collaborated with Liz Anderson and Norma Jean on the trio studio album called The Game of Triangles. Bare remained with RCA Victor until 1969, releasing his final album with the label that year called "Margie's at the Lincoln Park Inn" (And Other Controversial Songs).

In the early seventies, Bare recorded five studio albums for Mercury Records. His most successful was 1972's What Am I Gonna Do, which reached number 19 on the Top Country Albums chart. Bare returned to RCA Victor in 1973 and the label released six studio discs through 1977. Among them was 1973's Bobby Bare Sings Lullaby's, Legends and Lies. The disc was his most successful album to chart the Top Country Albums list, climbing to the number five position. Between 1978 and 1983, he recorded seven studio albums with Columbia Records. This included 1980's Down and Dirty, which became Bare's first LP to chart in Canada, climbing to number four on their RPM Country Albums chart. His 1982 album, Ain't Got Nothin' to Lose, was his final charting album as a solo artist. Bare has since continued to record sporadically. In the eighties and nineties, he issued two albums of Christmas music on independent labels. Under Atlantic Nashville, he released the project Old Dogs with several other country artists. His most recent album was 2020's Great American Saturday Night.

Studio albums

As lead artist

As a collaborative artist

Compilation albums

Box Sets

Live albums

References

Country music discographies
Discographies of American artists